The Chaco Wash is an arroyo (a periodic stream) cutting through Chaco Canyon, which is located in northwestern New Mexico on the Colorado Plateau. Another arroyo known as Escavada Wash is a tributary that feeds in from the northeast, near the western end of Chaco Canyon. Chaco Wash flows northwest to become the intermittent Chaco River.  It is a tributary of the San Juan River.

References

Bibliography
 

Colorado Plateau